Fabian is a 1980 West German drama film directed by Wolf Gremm. It is based on the novel Fabian, the Story of a Moralist (1931;) by German author Erich Kästner. The film was chosen as West Germany's official submission to the 53rd Academy Awards for Best Foreign Language Film, but did not receive a nomination.

Plot
The story of Jacob Fabian, a somewhat liberal Berlin advertising copywriter who witnesses the collapse of the prewar German society during the 1930s.

Cast
 Hans Peter Hallwachs as Fabian
 Hermann Lause as Labude
 Silvia Janisch as Cornelia
 Mijanou Van Baarzel as Frau Moll
 Brigitte Mira as Frau Hohlfeld
 Ivan Desny as Justizrat Labude
 Charles Regnier as Erfinder
 Ruth Niehaus as Ruth Relter
 Carola Regnier as Frau Kulp
 Roswitha Lippert as Frau Selow
 Helma Seitz as Fabians Mutter

See also
 List of submissions to the 53rd Academy Awards for Best Foreign Language Film
 List of German submissions for the Academy Award for Best Foreign Language Film

References

External links

1980 films
1980 drama films
West German films
German drama films
1980s German-language films
Films set in Berlin
Films set in 1930
Films set in 1931
Films based on German novels
Films based on works by Erich Kästner
Great Depression films
1980s German films